Hammephemera is an extinct genus of mayflies which existed during the early Triassic in what is now Nepal. It was described by Nina Sinitshenkova in 2012, and the type species is H. pulchra. The forewings measure approximately 8.75 millimetres by 4.06 millimetres.

References

External links
 Hammephemera at the Paleobiology Database

†
Fossils of Germany
Prehistoric insect genera
Triassic insects
Fossil taxa described in 2012